John Booth (died 5 April 1478, Surrey) was a 15th-century English prelate who held numerous appointments in the church and royal service.

Life

Booth was a scion of the ancient Cheshire family of Booth who were seated at Dunham Massey. He was a nephew of William Booth and Lawrence Booth, who both served as Archbishop of York.

In 1457 Booth was appointed the Provost of Beverley Minster and then in 1459 Archdeacon of Richmond, as well as Treasurer of Lichfield Cathedral, Canon of Sawley and Prebendary of Strensall. From 1461 until 1465, he was secretary to Edward IV, and for two of those years, 1463 and 1464, he served as the Chancellor of Cambridge University, receiving the degree of Doctor of Divinity. In 1464, he acquired the Prebendary of Bole and became Principal Secretary to Edward IV.

Booth was appointed Bishop of Exeter on 15 March 1465 and was consecrated bishop on 7 July 1465.

From 1471 to 1478, Booth served as a member of King Edward's Privy Council.

Following a visit to Croydon Palace, Booth died on 5 April 1478 at Horsley, where he was ex-officio lord of the manor.

Citations

References
 
 

15th-century births
1478 deaths
Chancellors of the University of Cambridge
Bishops of Exeter
15th-century English Roman Catholic bishops
Archdeacons of Richmond
John

Year of birth missing